The Bellinger River turtle (Myuchelys georgesi Cann, 1997) is a species of turtle in the family Chelidae. The species is of moderate size (carapace length to 240 mm in females, 185 mm in males), and is endemic to Australia with a highly restricted distribution to the small coastal drainage of the Bellinger River in New South Wales. In the past the species was considered locally abundant. The species' preferred habitat is the deeper pools of the clear-water upstream reaches of the river, where water flows continuously in most months over a bedrock basement and a stream bed of boulders, pebbles, and gravel. A captive breeding program has been under way since a 2015 virus outbreak came close to wiping out the entire species; most remaining individuals are currently housed in quarantine, though a small number have been reintroduced to the original habitat.

Etymology
The specific name, georgesi, is in honour of Australian herpetologist Arthur Georges.

Geographic range
Myuchelys georgesi is found in the Bellinger River and its tributaries, mid-eastern New South Wales, Australia.

Habitat
The preferred habitat of M. georgesi is the deeper pools of the clear-water upstream reaches of the river, where the water flows continuously in most months over a bedrock basement and a boulder, pebble and gravel bed. The species takes advantage of the highly oxygenated water with low particulate load by supplementing its oxygen uptake through cloacal breathing.

Diet
M. georgesi is essentially an omnivore, with tendencies leaning toward carnivory. A high proportion of their food comes from benthic macro-invertebrate communities that are relatively sedentary and live in immediate association with the substratum, but with some terrestrial fruit and aquatic vegetation eaten.

Reproduction
M. georgesi nests from October to December, laying 10-15 oblong white hard-shelled eggs.

Conservation status
Within the Bellinger drainage, a very restricted range, the species was formerly widely distributed and locally abundant, with threats to its persistence including habitat modification and loss of native riparian vegetation, associated turbidification and sedimentation, predation by the introduced European fox, and competition with the recently introduced turtle Emydura macquarii. In 2015, more than 90% of the adult population was wiped out by a virus, rendering the animal functionally extinct in the wild; a captive breeding program, with limited reintroduction, is working to re-establish a healthy population.

Gallery

References

External links

Myuchelys
Turtles of Australia
Reptiles described in 1997
Taxonomy articles created by Polbot